This is a list of women artists who were born in Palestine or whose artworks are closely associated with that country.

A
Jumana Emil Abboud (born 1971), contemporary artist
Karimeh Abbud (1893–1955), artist, photographer
Maliheh Afnan (1935–2016), visual artist
Laila Ajjawi (active since 2015), graffiti artist
Tamam Al-Akhal (born 1935), visual artist
Iman Al Sayed (born 1984), contemporary artist
Sama Raena Alshaibi (born 1973), conceptual artist

H
Rula Halawani (born 1964), photographic artist
Alexandra Handal (born 1975), Haitian-born contemporary artist and filmmaker
Mona Hatoum (born 1952), Lebanese-born video and installation artist
Jumana El Husseini (1932–2018), painter, sculptor, based in Paris

J
Emily Jacir (born 1972), contemporary artist, filmmaker

S
Raeda Saadeh (born 1977), visual artist
Laila Shawa (born 1940), visual artist
Ahlam Shibli (born 1970), photographer

-
Palestinian women artists, List of
Artists
Artists